Ray Charles Chadwick (born November 17, 1962) is a former American professional baseball player who played one season for the California Angels of Major League Baseball (MLB).

Chadwick attended Durham High School in Durham, North Carolina and Winston-Salem State University where he played college football for the Rams. In the offseasons, he played semi-professional baseball where he caught the attention of a California Angels scout who signed him to a contract.

On February 12, 1989, Chadwick was driving his car when he was hit head-on by a drunk driver. He was left with two broken vertebrae in his neck, two broken ribs, a cracked sternum and a broken non-throwing arm or wrist. His friend who was a passenger in the car suffered a cracked skull. He spent six weeks in a hospital bed and was told by doctors that he would probably not pitch that year but was back to pitching in the minors by July 1989.

After retirement from active play, Ray was the pitching coach for the University of British Columbia Thunderbirds from 1998 to 2000.

Ray now resides in Kamloops, British Columbia, Canada where he is coaching the Thompson Rivers University baseball team from 2003–present. Ray has won the Canadian College Baseball Conference Championship in both 2005 and 2007. During the summer Ray also coaches the Kamloops Sun Devils baseball team for junior aged players (19–21).

Ray is the father of professional soccer player Sydney Leroux.

References

External links

1962 births
Living people
African-American baseball players
American expatriate baseball players in Canada
Baseball players from North Carolina
Birmingham Barons players
California Angels players
Edmonton Trappers players
Major League Baseball pitchers
Midland Angels players
Omaha Royals players
Pawtucket Red Sox players
Peoria Chiefs players
Redwood Pioneers players
Salem Angels players
Sarasota White Sox players
Sportspeople from Durham, North Carolina
Vancouver Canadians players
Winston-Salem State Rams football players
American expatriate baseball players in Italy
Rimini Baseball Club players
21st-century African-American people
20th-century African-American sportspeople
African-American baseball coaches
College baseball coaches
American expatriate baseball players in Mexico